Donald Robert Whitehead (1938–1990) was an American entomologist, who specialized in the study of the biogeography and systematics of weevils.

Whitehead was awarded his Bachelor of Science degree in 1961, from Rutgers University, and his PhD from the University of Alberta in 1971.

In 1976, in the Systematic Entomology Laboratory, of the United States Department of Agriculture, Whitehead was appointed as Research Entomologist, where he did taxonomic work at the National Museum of Natural History. Whitehead remained in the position until his death in 1990.

References

External links
 

1938 births
1990 deaths
20th-century American zoologists
American entomologists
Coleopterists
Smithsonian Institution people
University of Alberta alumni
Rutgers University alumni
United States Department of Agriculture people